Rossiysky (masculine), Rossiyskaya (feminine), or Rossiyskoye (neuter), all meaning Russian, may refer to:
Rossiysky, Orenburg Oblast, a rural locality (a settlement) in Orenburg Oblast, Russia
Rossiysky, Rostov Oblast, a rural locality (a settlement) in Rostov Oblast, Russia
Rossiyskaya (Samara Metro), a station of the Samara Metro in Samara, Russia

See also
Russian (disambiguation)